Wang Hui may refer to:

 Wang Hui (Han dynasty), minister of vassal affairs under Emperor Wu of Han
 Wang Hui (Tang dynasty) (fl. 846–891), Tang chancellor
 Wang Hui (Qing dynasty) (1632–1717), painter during the Ming and Qing dynasties
 Wang Hui (intellectual) (born 1959), professor of Chinese literature, intellectual historian, and former editor of Dushu

Sportspeople
Wong Fai (born 1970), born Wang Hui, Chinese sports shooter who later represented Hong Kong
 Wang Hui (wrestler) (born 1976), Chinese wrestler
 Wang Hui (table tennis) (born 1978), Chinese table tennis player
 Wang Hui (judoka) (born 1984), Chinese judoka